The Grampian 23 is a Canadian trailerable sailboat that was designed by Alex McGruer as a cruiser and first built in 1971.

Production
The design was built by Grampian Marine in Canada between 1971 and 1976 with 450 boats completed, but it is now out of production.

Design
The Grampian 23 is a recreational keelboat, built predominantly of fibreglass, with wood trim. It has a masthead sloop rig, a spooned raked stem, an angled transom, a transom-hung rudder controlled by a tiller and a stub keel with a swing keel, or optional fixed fin keel. It displaces  and carries  of lead ballast.

The boat is normally fitted with a small  outboard motor for docking and manoeuvring.

The design has sleeping accommodation for five people, with a double "V"-berth in the bow cabin, a dinette table in the main cabin that converts to a double berth and an aft berth on the port side, under the cockpit. The galley is located on the port side amidships. The galley is equipped with a two-burner stove and a sink. The head is located just aft of the bow cabin on the starboard side.

For sailing downwind the design may be equipped with a symmetrical spinnaker.

Operational history
In a 2010 review Steve Henkel wrote, "the emphasis on this design appears to be to provide basic sailboat transportation at a low price. Beauty is not a selling point; her appearance is too slab-sided and top-heavy to qualify her as pretty. Best features: The raised poptop can be fitted with snap-on weather curtains and vinyl windows to make a serviceable convertible doghouse underway. Between the poptop hatch and a good-sized ventilation hatch forward, there should be plenty of air below. Worst features: The Grampian 23 is the slowest of her comp[etitor]s (despite her relatively long waterline), with a significantly higher PHRF rating. Construction is not nearly as high in quality as either of her comps. Her cockpit is small and squeezed toward the stern, which tends to force the stern down and the bow up when the cockpit is loaded. One owner says that the cockpit is 'about two feet short of perfect.' Presumably, the original plan was to allot more space to accommodations, but the idea somehow didn't work, as seen by comparing the Grampian 23 to the O'Day 23 Mk I ... The O'Day's layout nearly duplicates the Grampian’s, but somehow ends up with a 6 1/2-foot cockpit compared to the Grampian's 5 1/2-foot arrangement."

In a review, Michael McGoldrick wrote that the design is, "a spacious 23 footer with enough room for a private head. The large interior comes at the expense of the cockpit, which is a little small in comparison to other boats in this size range."

See also
List of sailing boat types

References

External links
Photo of a Grampian 23

Keelboats
1970s sailboat type designs
Sailing yachts
Trailer sailers
Sailboat type designs by Alex McGruer
Sailboat types built by Grampian Marine